Barrio is a Spanish surname. Notable people with the surname include:

 Artur Barrio (born 1945), Brazilian artist
 Diego Martínez Barrio (1882–1965), Spanish politician
 Francisco Barrio (born 1950), Mexican politician
 Ramon Del Barrio (born 1964), American performer, choreographer, dancer and singer
 Sonia Barrio (born 1969), former field hockey player

History

Before the 8th century Barrios was considered a noble surname, which evoked images of the ancient homeland of the Spanish people.  The original bearer of the local surname Barrios, was born in the country of Spain.  They adopted local surnames and were derived from localities which became increasingly widespread.  These local names depicted the ownership of villages or estates.  The surname, Barrios originate from the Spanish word Barrera because citizens lived surrounded by gates and fences.

References

See also
 Berrios